Boštjan Horvat (born 12 February 1975) is a Slovenian sprinter. He competed in the men's 4 × 400 metres relay at the 2000 Summer Olympics.

References

1975 births
Living people
Athletes (track and field) at the 2000 Summer Olympics
Slovenian male sprinters
Olympic athletes of Slovenia
Place of birth missing (living people)